Robert Hale or Bob Hale may refer to:

Politicians
 Robert Hale (Maine politician) (1889–1976), U.S. Representative from Maine
 Robert Blagden Hale, British Member of Parliament for West Gloucestershire
 Robert F. Hale (born 1947), Under Secretary of Defense and Assistant Secretary of the Air Force
 Robert S. Hale (1822–1881), U.S. Representative from New York

Other people
 Bob Hale (baseball) (1933–2012), American baseball player
 Bob Hale (philosopher) (1945–2017), British philosopher of mathematics
 Robert Hale (actor) (1874–1940), English actor featured in Waltzes from Vienna, etc.
 Robert Hale (bass-baritone) (born 1938), American opera singer
 Robert Hale (doctor) (1702–1767), physician of Beverly, Massachusetts
 Robert Allen Hale (1941–2008), felon known as 'Papa Pilgrim'
 Robert Beverly Hale (1901–1985), art writer and curator
 Robert G. Hale (born 1956), oral and maxillofacial surgeon
 Robert Lee Hale (1884–1969), American legal realist and institutional economist
 Robert M. Hale (1895–1952), American college football player and coach

Fictional characters
 Bob Hale, a character in the children's TV series Horrible Histories

Other uses
 Robert Hale (publishers), a British literary publishing house

See also
 Robert Hales (disambiguation)